Regier is a surname. Notable people with the surname include:

Darcy Regier (born 1956), Canadian ice hockey player
Erhart Regier (1916-1976), Canadian politician
Jason Regier (born 1975), American paralympic wheelchair rugby player
Jerry Regier (born 1945), American businessman and politician
Keith Regier, American politician
Matt Regier, American politician
Steve Regier (born 1984), Canadian ice hockey player
Wade Regier (born 1983), Canadian ice hockey coach